Batbayaryn Khash-Erdene (born 20 June 1997) is a Mongolian footballer who plays as a forward for Mongolian Premier League club Anduud City and the Mongolian national team.

Club career
Khash-Erdene has played for Mongolian Premier League club Anduud City since 2018, scoring the only goal in the first victory of the season; this was also Anduud City FC's first win under their new name. He was the league's second-highest goalscorer with 13 goals for the 2018 season. His contract was renewed following the season.

International career
Following a camp in June 2018, he made his senior international debut on 16 October 2018 in a friendly against Laos. He was then included in Mongolia's squad for Round 2 of the 2019 EAFF E-1 Football Championship.

In March 2019, Khash-Erdene competed in 2020 AFC U-23 Championship qualification, scoring a goal against Singapore.

International career statistics

References

External links
 
 
Mongolian Football Federation profile

1997 births
Living people
Mongolian footballers
Association football forwards
Mongolia international footballers
Anduud City FC players